An antistatic bag is a bag used for storing electronic components, which are prone to damage caused by electrostatic discharge (ESD).

These bags are usually plastic polyethylene terephthalate (PET) and have a distinctive color (silvery for metallised film, pink or black for polyethylene). The polyethylene variant may also take the form of foam or bubble wrap, either as sheets or bags. Multiple layers of protection are often used to protect from both mechanical damage and electrostatic damage. A protected device can be packaged inside a metalized PET film bag, inside a pink polyethylene bubble-wrap bag, which is finally packed inside a rigid black polyethylene box lined with pink poly foam. It is important that the bags only be opened at static-free workstations.

Dissipative antistatic bags, as the name suggests, are made of standard polyethylene with a static dissipative coating or layer on the plastic. This prevents buildup of a static charge on the surface of the bag, as it dissipates the charge to ground (i.e., whatever other surface it is touching). This bridge to ground is achieved with the inclusion of a tallow amine on the bags surface which attracts moisture that can conduct the charge to another surface, or to the atmosphere itself. In this sense, this type is truly 'antistatic' in that it hinders the formation of static charges. It, however, is not resistant to electrostatic discharge; if something else with a charge touches the bag (such as a person's hand), its charge would easily transfer through the bag and its contents. These bags are usually pink or red in color because of the dissipative chemical layer. Black bags also exist, wherein the polyethylene is manufactured containing trace amounts of carbon, forming a partial shield, though not a complete one.

Conductive antistatic bags are manufactured with a layer of conductive metal, often aluminum, and a dielectric layer of plastic covered in a static dissipative coating. This forms both a shield and a non-conductive barrier, shielding the contents from static charge via the Faraday cage effect. These bags are preferred for more sensitive parts, but they also see use in environments where sparks would be hazardous, such as oxygen-rich areas in aircraft and hospitals. Metalized bags are more fragile than their nonmetal counterparts, however, as any puncture compromises the integrity of the shield. In addition, they have a limited shelf life, as the metal substrate can deteriorate over time. These bags are often gray or silver owing to the metal layer, while still being transparent to some degree.

Foam also exists in both pink (dissipative) and black (conductive) varieties, used for storing individual leaded components by piercing the leads into the foam.

See also 

 ESD materials
 Antistatic device
 Antistatic garments
 Antistatic agent
 Antistatic mat
 Antistatic wrist strap
Electromagnetic shielding
 Electrostatic sensitive device
 Velostat

References

Further reading
 Yam, K. L., "Encyclopedia of Packaging Technology", John Wiley & Sons, 2009, 
  ANSI/ESD S541  

Electrostatics
Digital electronics
Bags